lg1 or variation, may refer to:

 La Grande-1 generating station (LG-1), Quebec, Canada
 Lehrgeschwader 1 (LG 1), WWII German Luftwaffe air wing
 GIAT LG1, 105mm towed howitzer
 Gibson LG-1 acoustic guitar, see Gibson L Series
 First late glacial (LG1), a period of the Older Dryas ice age
 Laminin G domain 1 (LG1)
 Lower Group 1, of the Bushveld Igneous Complex
 Chiang Kai-shek Memorial Hall metro station (station code LG01) on the Tamsui–Xinyi line, Songshan–Xindian line, and Wanda–Zhonghe–Shulin line in Taipei, Taiwan
 Aizkraukle District (LG01), Latvia; see List of FIPS region codes (J–L)

See also

LG (disambiguation)
LGI (disambiguation)